Deretrichia is a genus of leaf beetles in the subfamily Eumolpinae. It is known from Australia, New Guinea and associated islands in the Australasian realm, east of Wallace's Line. It was first erected by the German entomologist Julius Weise in 1913 for six species transferred from Rhyparida. In 1963, the genus was revised by Brian J. Selman, who described many new species and transferred some more species from Rhyparida.

Species

 Deretrichia alternata (Baly, 1864)
 Deretrichia amboinensis Selman, 1963
 Deretrichia andannensis (Jacoby, 1894) (andaiensis?)
 Deretrichia approximata (Baly, 1867)
 Deretrichia australis Selman, 1963
 Deretrichia batchianica Selman, 1963
 Deretrichia bipustulata (Baly, 1867)
 Deretrichia brunnea (Baly, 1867)
 Deretrichia bryanti Selman, 1963
 Deretrichia cyclopensis Selman, 1963
 Deretrichia doryensis Selman, 1963
 Deretrichia flebilis Selman, 1963
 Deretrichia frontalis (Baly, 1867)
 Deretrichia giloloensis Selman, 1963
 Deretrichia guadalcanalensis Selman, 1963
 Deretrichia hincksi Selman, 1963
 Deretrichia inornata (Jacoby, 1894)
 Deretrichia intermedia (Baly, 1867)
 Deretrichia laevifrons (Jacoby, 1884)
 Deretrichia laticollis (Baly, 1867)
 Deretrichia livida Selman, 1963
 Deretrichia minuta Selman, 1963
 Deretrichia morokensis Selman, 1963
 Deretrichia nigra Selman, 1963
 Deretrichia nigronotata Selman, 1963
 Deretrichia pallidocaudata Selman, 1963
 Deretrichia papuensis Selman, 1963
 Deretrichia paumomuensis Selman, 1963
 Deretrichia pinguis Selman, 1963
 Deretrichia plebeja (Jacoby, 1894)
 Deretrichia rothschildi (Jacoby, 1894)
 Deretrichia ruginotum Selman, 1963
 Deretrichia semipunctata (Baly, 1867)
 Deretrichia separata (Baly, 1867)
 Deretrichia sordida (Baly, 1864)
 Deretrichia sulcicollis (Baly, 1867)
 Deretrichia szentivani Selman, 1963
 Deretrichia tibialis (Baly, 1867)
 Deretrichia tibialis Medvedev, 2013 (homonym?)
 Deretrichia timorensis (Jacoby, 1894)
 Deretrichia variabilis (Baly, 1867)
 Deretrichia viridis Selman, 1963
 Deretrichia wallacei Selman, 1963

References

External links
 Genus Deretrichia Weise, 1913 at Australian Faunal Directory

Eumolpinae
Chrysomelidae genera
Beetles of Asia
Beetles of Australia
Taxa named by Julius Weise